Weepine Lake is a small lake in the municipality of Dysart et al, Haliburton County in Central Ontario, Canada. It is within Algonquin Provincial Park and is part of the Ottawa River drainage basin.

Geography
The nearest named community is Kennaway,  to the east.

There two unnamed inflows, one at the north and one at the west. The primary outflow, at the south end of the lake, is an unnamed stream that flows south to Fourcorner Lake. Fourcorner Lake flows via Fourcorner Creek, Benoir Lake, the York River and the Madawaska River to the Ottawa River.

References

Lakes of Haliburton County